Hawco may refer to:

 Allan Hawco (born 1977), Canadian actor and producer
 Darren Hawco, officer in the Royal Canadian Navy
 Matthew E. Hawco (1882–1962), Canadian engineer, magistrate and politician
 Sherry Hawco (1964–1991), Canadian artistic gymnast